The Central Bank of Iraq (CBI) is the central bank of Iraq. It was established in 1947, the same year in which the British occupation of Iraq was ended. CBI's primary objectives are to ensure domestic price stability and foster a stable competitive market based financial system.

History

After World War I and the dissolution of the Ottoman Empire, Iraq's monetary system was administered by the British Mandate of Mesopotamia until 1931, when the Iraq Currency Board was established in London to issue the new Iraqi dinar and maintain its reserves. The Iraq Currency Board pursued a "conservative monetary policy, maintaining very high reserves behind the dinar", which was "further strengthened by its link to the British pound".

In 1949, the currency board was replaced by the National Bank of Iraq, which had been founded two years before on 16 November 1947. The National Bank of Iraq became the Central Bank of Iraq in 1956. Since switching over to its own central bank, the Iraqi monetary system was "replete with mismanagement, coercive stop-gap measures, and the production of an unstable, unreliable currency which ha[d] not been tradable on the international market for [many] years". Saddam Hussein wielded monetary and the dinar as "a powerful instrument of repression".

Beginning on 18 March 2003 (the day before United States forces entered Baghdad as part of the 2003 invasion of Iraq), nearly US$1 billion was stolen from the Central Bank of Iraq. That month, a handwritten note signed by Saddam Hussein surfaced, ordering $920 million to be withdrawn and given to his son Qusay Hussein. Bank officials state that Qusay and another unidentified man oversaw the cash, boxes of $100 bills secured with stamped seals known as security money, being loaded into trucks and trailers during a five-hour operation. This was considered the largest bank heist in history until 2011.  Qusay Hussein was later killed by the U.S. 101st Airborne Division in a battle.

U.S. Department of the Treasury and Coalition Provisional Authority inspectors discovered the bank in ruins after the Battle of Baghdad and mass looting after the invasion. After the fall of Saddam Hussein's government, the Central Bank of Iraq was established as Iraq's independent central bank by the Central Bank of Iraq Law 2004, with authorised capital of 100 billion dinars. According to the law, 100% of the bank's capital stock would be held by the State and would not be transferable.
 
The Constitution of Iraq states that the central bank is a financially and administratively independent institution, responsible before the Council of Representatives of Iraq. According to the Constitution, the Iraqi federal government has the "exclusive authority" of "establishing and administering a central bank".

On 25 January 2011, the Supreme Court of Iraq ruled that the Central Bank of Iraq should be under supervision of the Council of Ministers of Iraq. Then Central Bank chief Sinan Al Shabibi warned that the ruling would threaten the institution's requisite independence.

Currently, the acting Governor of the Central Bank of Iraq is Abdel Basset Turki, who also happens to be the head of the state-spending watchdog the Board of Supreme Audit.

During the Battle of Mosul in June 2014, Islamic State of Iraq and the Levant (ISIL) militants looted the Central Bank in Mosul, absconding with over US$429 million.

Governors
Governors of the Central Bank of Iraq since its establishment:

 12/6/1948 to 14/2/1949: Tawfiq al-Suwaidi
 14/2/1949 to 23/3/1949: Saleh Haidar
 24/3/1949 to 30/4/1959: Abdulellah Hafedh
 1/5/1959 to 14/11/1960: Nadhim al-Zahawi
 15/11/1960 to 31/12/1962: Abdullatif al-Shawaf
 1/1/1963 to 18/1/1963: Ahmed Abdullbaqy
 19/1/1963 to 14/8/1963: Abdulhassan Zalzalah
 15/8/1963 to 28/11/1965: Khairuddin Haseeb
 29/11/1965 to 20/1/1969: Saleh Abdul Amir Kubba
 17/12/1968 to 20/5/1973: Abdulhassan Zalzalah
 12/5/1973 to 29/12/1975: Fawzi al-Qaisi
 27/12/1975 to 13/5/1976: Ahmed Abdullbaqy
 11/5/1976 to 1/7/1976: Salah al-Din al-Sheikhli
 1/7/1976 to 29/4/1978: Fakhri Kadouri
 3/5/1978 to 15/7/1979: Ezz al-Din Mohamed Saleem al-Bahrani
 16/7/1979 to 10/10/1984: Hassan Tawfiq Al-Najafi
 10/10/1984 to 23/10/1987: Hikmat Mizban Ibrahim al-Azzawi
 3/6/1989 to 30/6/1991: Subhi Nadhem Frankool
 12/12/1991 to 31/5/1994: Tariq Taleb al-Takmachi
 1/6/1994 to 8/4/2003: Essam Rasheed Howaish
 4/9/2003 to 17/10/2012: Sinan Al Shabibi
 17/10/2012 to 9/9/2014: Abdel Basset Turki
 9/9/2014 to 15/9/2020: Ali Mohsen al-Alaq
 Since 15/9/2020: Mustafa Ghaleb

Architecture
The bank headquarters were designed by Danish architects Dissing+Weitling and was completed in 1985. It is a cubical building constructed of reinforced concrete clad in marble. It has few exterior openings, and is instead organised around an inner courtyard which cuts through the heart of the structure and rises to a height of 40m. The courtyard is surrounded on all sides by offices separated by an interior glass curtain wall.

In August 2010, architect Zaha Hadid, born in Baghdad, was appointed to design a new headquarters for the Central Bank in Baghdad. Initial talks about the project were held in Istanbul, Turkey, on 14 August 2010, in the presence of the Central Bank Governor Sinan Al Shabibi. On 2 February 2012, Zaha Hadid joined Sinan Al Shabibi at a ceremony in London to sign the agreement between the Central Bank of Iraq and Zaha Hadid Architects for the design stages of the new CBI Headquarters building.

Objectives
As of at least 28 March 2011, the official website of the CBI states "the primary objectives of the Central Bank of Iraq (CBI) are to ensure domestic price stability and to foster a stable competitive market-based financial system. The CBI shall also promote sustainable growth, employment and prosperity in Iraq". The CBI web site further states that the functions of the CBI in addition to the primary objectives mentioned above include:

 To implement the monetary policy and the exchange rate policy for Iraq.
 To hold gold and manage the state reserves of gold.
 To issue and manage the Iraq currency.
 To establish, oversee, and promote a sound and efficient payment system.
 To issue licenses or permits to banks and to regulate and supervise banks as further specified by the Banking Law.
 To carry out any related ancillary tasks or transactions within the framework of Iraqi law.

The objectives of the Central Bank of the Iraq are as follows:
 Maintaining inflation stability
 Implementing monetary policy (including exchange rate policies)
 Managing the state's reserves
 Issuing and managing the Iraqi dinar
 Regulating private banks

As of December 2009, the bank reported total assets valued at over 57 trillion dinars. The bank's head office is located in Baghdad with four branches in Basrah, Mosul, Sulaimaniyah, and Erbil. However, currently the bank does not control the financial and administrative affairs of Erbil and Sulaimaniyah branches, as these branches are technically reporting to the Baghdad headquarters and for all other issues they are reporting to Kurdistan Regional Government (KRG) and they are financed by KRG.

As of July 2010, steps and measures have taken place in order to integrate these branches with the headquarters in Baghdad.

Foreign exchange reserves have increased to nearly US$67 billion (as of September 2012) due to a rise in oil revenues, indicating the improved ability since 2003 to deal with the repayment of foreign debt, the currency stabilization, and the coverage of average monthly imports.

See also

Economy of Iraq
 British currency in the Middle East
Iraqi dinar
List of banks in Iraq

References

External links
The Central Bank of Iraq official Website 
Related topics - Iraq Business News
Iraq central bank Attack, June 2010
Fire engulfs Iraqi central bank, January 2008
Former Central Bank of Iraq Chiefs
The Great Bank Robbery
UK troops foil Iraq bank robbery
Foreign banks sending money to Iraq
Dmoz.org - Iraqi Dinar

Iraq
Organizations based in Baghdad
Economy of Iraq
Bank robberies
Banks of Iraq
Commercial buildings completed in 1985
1947 establishments in Iraq
Banks established in 1947